

Offseason 
 September 19, 1944: Freddie Fitzsimmons' managerial contract was extended for 1945.
 February 11, 1945: Jimmie Foxx was signed as a free agent by the Phillies.
 Prior to 1945 season (exact date unknown)
Tommy Lasorda was signed as an amateur free agent by the Phillies.
Carl Sawatski was signed as an amateur free agent by the Phillies.

Regular season

Season standings

Record vs. opponents

Notable transactions 
 May 8, 1945: Buster Adams was traded by the Phillies to the St. Louis Cardinals for Glenn Crawford and John Antonelli.

Roster

Player stats

Batting

Starters by position 
Note: Pos = Position; G = Games played; AB = At bats; H = Hits; Avg. = Batting average; HR = Home runs; RBI = Runs batted in

Other batters 
Note: G = Games played; AB = At bats; H = Hits; Avg. = Batting average; HR = Home runs; RBI = Runs batted in

Pitching

Starting pitchers 
Note: G = Games pitched; IP = Innings pitched; W = Wins; L = Losses; ERA = Earned run average; SO = Strikeouts

Other pitchers 
Note: G = Games pitched; IP = Innings pitched; W = Wins; L = Losses; ERA = Earned run average; SO = Strikeouts

Relief pitchers 
Note: G = Games pitched; W = Wins; L = Losses; SV = Saves; ERA = Earned run average; SO = Strikeouts

Farm system

Notes

References 
1945 Philadelphia Phillies season at Baseball Reference

Philadelphia Phillies seasons
Philadelphia Phillies season
Philadelphia